Zabofloxacin (DW-224a) is an investigational fluoroquinolone antibiotic for multidrug-resistant infections due to Gram-positive bacteria. It also has activity against Neisseria gonorrhoeae including strains that are resistant to other quinolone antibiotics.

Zabofloxacin was discovered by Dong Wha Pharmaceuticals and licensed to Pacific Beach BioSciences for development.

A double-blind, three-arm clinical study of the drug began in March 2010.

References

External links
 A Phase 2, Multi-dose, Double-Blind, Randomized, Multicenter, Safety and Efficacy Study of Zabofloxacin vs Moxifloxacin in the Treatment of Mild to Moderate Community-Acquired Pneumonia

Fluoroquinolone antibiotics